East River Plaza is a shopping mall located at FDR Drive near the Harlem River between 116th and 119th Street in East Harlem, New York City. Opened on November 12, 2009, after a protracted development process lasting 15 years, the mall has twelve stores with four anchor stores, which are Target, Costco, Burlington Coat Factory, and PetSmart. It has six levels and is attached to a parking garage.

Anchors
 Burlington
 Costco
 Target

Tenants
 Aldi
 Applebee's
 Bob's Discount Furniture
 Burlington
 Costco
 Marshalls
 Planet Fitness
 Starbucks (located in Target)
 Target

References

External links
 
 "East River Plaza Parking Still Really, Really Empty, New Research Shows" by Noah Kazis, Streetsblog, April 20, 2012

Shopping malls in New York City
Shopping malls established in 2009
2009 establishments in New York City
Commercial buildings in Manhattan
East Harlem